Gastón Rodríguez may refer to:

 Gastón Rodríguez (swimmer) (born 1984), Argentine swimmer
 Gastón Rodríguez (footballer) (born 1992), Uruguayan footballer